The Archdeacon of Halifax is the priest in charge of the archdeaconry of Halifax, an administrative division of the Church of England Diocese of Leeds (formerly in the Diocese of Wakefield.)

History
The Archdeaconry was founded (from the Archdeaconry of Craven in the Diocese of Ripon, plus three parishes of the Archdeaconry of York) with the erection of the Diocese of Wakefield on 20 November 1888. From then until its reorganisation in 1927, the archdeaconry of Huddersfield comprised all but the northwestern corner of that diocese. In 1927, the archdeaconry was renamed to that of Halifax and its borders moved to cover the western half of the diocese (the old Halifax archdeaconry became the archdeaconry of Pontefract).

The (second) archdeaconry of Halifax has constituted the western half of the diocese since the 1927 reorganisation, covering the deaneries of Calder Valley, Halifax, Brighouse and Elland, Huddersfield, Almondbury and Kirkheaton. Since the creation of the Diocese of Leeds on 20 April 2014, the archdeaconry forms the Huddersfield episcopal area.

List of archdeacons

Archdeacons of Huddersfield
1888–1892 (res.): Norman Straton
April 1892 – 1913 (ret.): William Donne
1914–1927: Richard Harvey (became Archdeacon of Halifax)

Archdeacons of Halifax
With the diocesan reorganisation of 1927, the archdeaconry was renamed to Halifax.

1927–1935 (ret.): Richard Harvey (previously Archdeacon of Huddersfield)
1935–1946 (ret.): Albert Baines
1946–1949 (res.): Arthur Morris
1949–1961 (res.): Eric Treacy
1961–1972 (res.): John Lister
1972–1984 (ret.): John Alford (afterwards archdeacon emeritus)
1985–1989 (res.): Alan Chesters
1989–1994 (res.): David Hallatt
1995–2003 (res.): Richard Inwood (became Bishop suffragan of Bedford)
2003–28 October 2011 (res.): Robert Freeman
22 January 201231 October 2021 (ret.): Anne Dawtry
27 February 2022present: Bill Braviner

References

Lists of Anglicans
 
Archdeacons of Huddersfield
Lists of English people